Dean Bartlett Cromwell (September 20, 1879 – August 3, 1962), nicknamed "Maker of Champions", was an American athletic coach in multiple sports, principally at the University of Southern California (USC). He was the head coach of the USC track team from 1909 to 1948, excepting 1914 and 1915, and guided the team to 12 NCAA team national championships (1926, 1930–31, 1935–43) and 34 individual NCAA titles. He was the head coach for the U.S. track team at the 1948 Olympic Games in London, and assistant head coach for the U.S. track team at the 1936 Berlin Olympics.

In Berlin he was responsible for the expulsion of the only two Jewish American sprinters (Sam Stoller and Marty Glickman) from the 4x100m relay team, while trying to appease Adolf Hitler.

Early life
Born in Turner, Oregon, Cromwell moved to southern California with his family as a boy after his father's death, and attended Occidental Prep School and Occidental College, graduating in 1902. While at Occidental, he was a multi-sport standout athlete, playing football and baseball and competing in track and cycling; in 1901 the Helms Athletic Foundation named him the outstanding athlete in southern California. After college, he worked for the telephone company, also continuing to compete in local amateur sports.

Career

After being hired as USC's track coach, he became known for his skill in developing star athletes. His many outstanding pupils included Fred Kelly (1912 gold medalist in the 110m hurdles), Charley Paddock (1920 gold medalist in the 100m and 4 × 100 relay), Bud Houser (1924 gold medalist in the shot put and discus; 1928 gold medalist in the discus), Jess Mortensen (1929 NCAA javelin champion, 1931 world record in the decathlon), Frank Wykoff (1928, 1932 and 1936 gold medalist in the 4 × 100 relay), Ken Carpenter (1936 gold medalist in the discus), Earle Meadows (1936 gold medalist in the pole vault), Louis Zamperini (collegiate record-holder in the mile from 1938–53), Wilbur Thompson (1948 gold medalist in the shot put), Cliff Bourland (1948 gold medalist in the 4 × 400 relay), Bill Sefton (two-time world record holder in the pole vault), and Mel Patton (1948 gold medalist in the 200m and 4 × 100 relay). Athletes coached by Cromwell eventually set individual world records in 14 events and relay world records in three others, and won 12 Olympic gold medals during his time at USC.

Cromwell also served as the head coach of the USC Trojans football program from 1909 to 1910, and from 1916 to 1918. His involvement with USC football goes back even farther; he is known to have officiated USC games as early as 1903, and he played (along with the coaches of both teams) for USC opponent Harvard School in a 1905 game due to the weakness of the Harvard roster. In his first term as coach, 1909 to 1910, he posted a record of 10–1–3, but this was exclusively against southern California competition, with no major colleges on the schedule. Like many schools, USC switched from football to rugby, from 1911 to 1913. Cromwell returned as football coach in 1916, by which time USC's teams had begun to be known as the Trojans. By this point, the university was facing competition which more regularly included major colleges such as California, Utah and Stanford, and his relative lack of expertise in the sport was more readily apparent. World War I also depleted the team's ranks in 1917 and 1918. In his final three years his record was still respectable at 11–7–3, though only 4–4–1 against major colleges. In his final season in 1918, USC was 2–2–2.  They did not play a home game in Los Angeles until December 14 due to a citywide ban on public gatherings during the Spanish flu epidemic.  Cromwell was replaced as head football coach following the season by Gus Henderson. During his tenure, Cromwell compiled a 21–8–6 record. Apart from Sam Barry, who took over the 1941 team in the wake of Howard Jones' death, Cromwell was the last USC football coach for whom it was not his primary sport. He also coached the USC basketball team in 1918, though they only played two games against the Los Angeles Athletic Club, losing both.

After retiring, Cromwell continued to serve as an advisor in track and field, and briefly was the field announcer for the National Football League's Los Angeles Rams. He died at age 82 at his Los Angeles home after suffering a heart attack; he had suffered a previous attack in March of the same year. He was survived by his wife Gertrude and their three sons; his cremated remains were interred at Twin Oaks Cemetery in Turner, Oregon. He was inducted into the National Track & Field Hall of Fame in its inaugural class in 1974, and into the USC Athletic Hall of Fame in its second class in 1995. He is also a member of the Occidental College Track and Field Hall of Fame.

Cromwell can be seen as a contestant on the December 16, 1954 edition of You Bet Your Life (season 5, episode 14).

Controversy
In order to curry favor with Avery Brundage, U.S. Olympic Committee Chairman, Cromwell joined the isolationist America First Committee, of which Brundage was a founding member and organizer.

As a coach in Berlin in 1936, Cromwell held the only two Jewish American sprinters - Marty Glickman and Sam Stoller - away from the 4x100m relay team. It is said that he wanted to please Brundage, the head of the United States, who was soon the head of the IOC, was a well-known Nazi supporter, who wanted not to offend Adolf Hitler by being a Jewish emissary. He never regretted his actions.

Head coaching record

Football

Writings
 The High Jump''', published in 1939, International Sports, Inc., Indianapolis, Indiana
  "Championship Technique In Track And Field, A Book For Athletes, Coaches, And Spectators"
    Written in collaboration with Al Wesson.  Published in 1941 by Whittlesey House/MaGraw-Hill
    Book Company, Inc.

See also
USC Trojans
 List of college football head coaches with non-consecutive tenure

References

Additional sources
Porter, David L., ed. (1988). Biographical Dictionary of American Sports: Outdoor Sports. Westport, Connecticut: Greenwood Press. .
"Dean Cromwell Mourned by Sports World." Los Angeles Times''. August 5, 1962.
2006 USC Football Media Guide
"Marty Glickman at Jewish Virtual Library". Jewishvirtuallibrary.org. Retrieved June 7, 2010; Jewish Athletes – Marty Glickman & Sam Stoller". U.S. Holocaust Museum.  Stanley Meisler (July 23, 1996).
"Nazi Games Exhibit Details Discrimination, Deception: Two American Jews were booted off track team, apparently to spare Hitler embarrassment". Los Angeles Times
Glickman tells of '36 Games". Syracuse Herald Journal. January 20, 1980
Mistake of 1936 Olympic Games Not Forgotten". Los Angeles Times. March 29, 1998.
Charles Chi Halevi (April 10, 2000). "Games of Shame".
The Jerusalem Post, Howard Z. Unger (March 31, 1998).

External links
 
 Occidental College Track and Field Hall of Fame
 Cromwell Field
 

1879 births
1962 deaths
American track and field coaches
Occidental Tigers baseball players
Occidental Tigers football players
USC Trojans football coaches
USC Trojans men's basketball coaches
USC Trojans track and field coaches
People from Marion County, Oregon
Turner, Oregon
Basketball coaches from California